Sanli may refer to:

People
 Şanlı, Turkish surname
 Li Sanli (born 1935), Chinese computer scientist
 Ma Sanli (1914–2003), Chinese comedian

Places
 Sanli, Nanling County, in Nanling County, Anhui
 Sanli, Guigang, in Qintang District, Guigang, Guangxi
 Sanli, Shanglin County, in Shanglin County, Guangxi
 Sanli, Wuxuan County, in Wuxuan County, Guangxi
 Sanli, Wuhan, in Huangpi District, Wuhan, Hubei
 Sanli, Lantian County, in Lantian County, Shaanxi
 Sanli, Bofan, in Bofan, Anlu, Xiaogan, Hubei

Other
Sanli, or San li 三礼 - three classical Chinese texts on ritual (Zhouli, Yili, Liji), cf. :nl:Sanli

See also
Sanlih